The Southern Intercollegiate Athletic Conference women's basketball tournament is the annual conference women's basketball championship tournament for the Southern Intercollegiate Athletic Conference. The tournament has been held annually since 1978. It is a single-elimination tournament and seeding is based on regular season records.

The winner receives the SIAC's automatic bid to the NCAA Division II women's basketball tournament.

Fort Valley State have been the most successful team at the CIAA tournament, with eleven championships.

History

Championship records

 Allen, Central State (OH), Edward Waters, Miles, Savannah State, and Spring Hill have not yet won the SIAC tournament
 Claflin, Fisk, Knoxville, Morris Brown, Paine, Rust, and Stillman never won the tournament as SIAC members
 Schools highlighted in pink are former members of the SIAC

See also
 SIAC men's basketball tournament

References

NCAA Division II women's basketball conference tournaments
Basketball Tournament, Women's
Recurring sporting events established in 1978